Ipheion uniflorum is a species of flowering plant, related to the onions, so is placed in the allium subfamily (Allioideae) of the Amaryllidaceae. It is known by the common name springstar, or spring starflower. Along with all the species of the genus Ipheion, some sources place it in the genus Tristagma, but research published in 2010 suggested that this is not correct. It is native  to Argentina and Uruguay, but is widely cultivated as an ornamental and reportedly naturalized in Great Britain, France, Australia, New Zealand  and the United States.

Description
The foliage has an onionlike scent when crushed. Each honey-scented, star-shaped flower has six pointed lobes up to 3 centimeters long in shades of very pale to deep purple-blue.

Cultivation
Ipheion uniflorum has been grown in the UK since 1820, when bulbs collected from near Buenos Aires arrived in the country. It is recommended for growing in a well-drained position outside or as long-flowering pot plant in an unheated greenhouse. Various named forms are in cultivation, some of which may be hybrids. 'Wisley Blue' is a clear lilac blue; 'Froyle Mill' is a deeper violet blue; 'Album' is white. The cultivar 'Alberto Castillo', also white, has larger flowers and was collected in the 1980s by Alberto Castillo, the owner of Ezeiza Botanical Garden, from an abandoned Buenos Aires garden. In the USA, the species is stated to be hardy to USDA Zone 5, and is recommended for massing in borders, alpine gardens and other areas, or it can be naturalized in lawns.

The following cultivars have gained the Royal Horticultural Society's Award of Garden Merit:- 

’Alberto Castillo’ 
'Froyle Mill'
'Rolf Fiedler'  
'Wisley Blue'

Media

References

External links

Jepson Manual Treatment

Allioideae
Flora of Argentina
Flora of Uruguay
Flora of Australia
Flora of New Zealand
Flora of France
Flora of Great Britain
Plants described in 1830
Garden plants of South America